Pyro comes from the Greek word πῦρ (pyr), meaning fire. It may refer to:

Businesses
Pyro Plastics Corporation, a plastic model kit maker 1940s through the 1970s
Pyro Studios, a computer game developer based in Madrid
NRK P3 Pyro, a Norwegian Internet-based music radio station

Entertainment
 "Pyro" (song), by Kings of Leon, 2010
 "Pyro", a song by Budjerah from his 2021 self-titled EP
 Pyro (Marvel Comics), a Marvel Comics supervillain
 Pyro (Team Fortress 2), one of the playable classes in the video game
 Pyro... The Thing Without a Face, a 1964 film starring Barry Sullivan and Martha Hyer
 A god in the video game Sacrifice
 One of the seven elements in the game Genshin Impact

Other uses
Pyro (horse), an American thoroughbred racehorse
Pyro, Ohio, United States
, two U.S. Navy ammunition ships
Short for pyrotechnics
Slang for a person afflicted with pyromania, the inability to resist the impulse to deliberately start fires
Pyro cable, mineral-insulated copper-clad cable (MICC), a fire-resistant electrical cable
Probabilistic programming language Pyro, extending from PyTorch

See also
Pyros (disambiguation)